Xyalidae is a family of nematodes belonging to the order Monhysterida.

Genera
Genera:
 Ammotheristus Lorenzen, 1977
 Amphimonhystera Timm, 1961
 Amphimonhystrella Timm, 1961
 Arabanema Turpeenniemi, Nasira & Maqbool, 2001
 Austronema Cobb, 1914
 Buccolaimus Allgén, 1959
 Capsula Bussau, 1993
 Cenolaimus Cobb, 1933
 Cienfuegia Armenteros, Vincx & Decraemer, 2009
 Cobbia de Man, 1907
 Corononema Nicholas & Stewart, 1995
 Dactylaimoides Blome, 2002
 Dactylaimus Cobb, 1920
 Daptonema Cobb, 1920
 Echinotheristus Thun & Riemann, 1967
 Elzalia Gerlach, 1957
 Enchonema Bussau, 1993
 Filipjeva Ditlevsen, 1928
 Gnomoxyala Lorenzen, 1977
 Gonionchus Cobb, 1920
 Guitartia Armenteros, 2010
 Gullanema Nicholas & Stewart, 1995
 Hofmaenneria Gerlach & Meyl, 1957
 Hofmaenneria Gerlach & Meyl, 1957
 Lamyronema Leduc, 2015
 Linhystera Juario, 1974
 Litotes Cobb, 1920
 Longilaimus Allgén, 1958
 Manganonema Bussau, 1993
 Marisalbinema Tchesunov, 1990
 Metadesmolaimus Schuurmans Stekhoven, 1935
 Omicronema Cobb, 1920
 Paradaptonema Gagarin, 2020
 Paragnomoxyala Jiang & Huang, 2015
 Paragonionchus Blome, 2002
 Paramonohystera Steiner, 1916
 Paramphimonhystrella Huang & Zhang, 2006
 Parelzalia Tchesunov, 1990
 Penzencia De Man
 Promonhystera Wieser, 1956
 Prorhynchonema Gourbault, 1982
 Pseudechinotheristus Blome, 2002
 Pseudelzalia Yu & Xu, 2015
 Pseudosteineria Wieser, 1956
 Pulchranemella N.Cobb, 1933
 Retrotheristus Lorenzen, 1977
 Rhynchonema Cobb, 1920
 Robustnema Nicholas, 1996
 Sacrimarinema Shoshin, 2001
 Scaptrella Cobb, 1917
 Sphaerotheristus Timm, 1968
 Spiramphinema Wieser, 1956
 Steineria Micoletzky, 1922
 Stylotheristus Lorenzen, 1977
 Theristus Bastian, 1865
 Theristus Bastian, 1865
 Valvaelaimus Lorenzen, 1977
 Wieserius Chitwood & Murphy, 1964
 Xenolaimus Cobb, 1920
 Xyala Cobb, 1920
 Zygonemella Cobb, 1920

References

Nematodes